Xanthorrhoea glauca, known as the grass tree, is a large plant in the genus Xanthorrhoea, widespread in eastern Australia. The trunk can grow in excess of 5 metres tall, and may be many branched. It is occasionally seen in large communities in nutrient rich soils. The leaves are a grey or bluish glaucous green.

Two sub-species are recognised; subspecies angustifolia and glauca.

Aboriginal (Ngunnawal) uses
The flower spike soaked in water makes a sweet drink. The growing part of the leaf stem and the white leaf bases can be eaten. The dried flower stems form a base for fire drills when making a fire. The resin from the base of the leaves is a glue used when making weapons and axes.

References

Flora of New South Wales
Flora of Queensland
glauca